The Moldova women's national under-16 basketball team is a national basketball team of Moldova, administered by the Basketball Federation of Moldova.
It represents the country in women's international under-16 basketball competitions.

The team finished 22nd at the 2017 FIBA U16 Women's European Championship Division B. Their best results at the Division C championships were two fourth places in 2018 and 2019.

See also
Moldova women's national basketball team
Moldova women's national under-18 basketball team
Moldova men's national under-16 basketball team

References

External links
Archived records of Moldova team participations

Basketball in Moldova
Women's national under-16 basketball teams
Basketball